The Canton of Saulxures-sur-Moselotte is a French former canton, one of fifteen located within the arrondissement of Épinal in the Vosges département. It was disbanded following the French canton reorganisation which came into effect in March 2015. It consisted of 10 communes, which joined the canton of La Bresse in 2015. It had 18,670 inhabitants (2012).

The canton comprised the following communes:

Basse-sur-le-Rupt
La Bresse
Cornimont
Gerbamont
Rochesson
Sapois
Saulxures-sur-Moselotte
Thiéfosse
Vagney
Ventron

References

Saulxures-sur-Moselotte
2015 disestablishments in France
States and territories disestablished in 2015